Gonystylus glaucescens is a species of plant in the Thymelaeaceae family. It is endemic to Kalimantan in Indonesia.

References

glaucescens
Endemic flora of Borneo
Vulnerable plants
Taxonomy articles created by Polbot